Aleksandar Jovanović (born 12 February 1968) is a journalist, editor, television personality, and politician in Serbia. He has served in the National Assembly of Serbia since 2020 as a member of the Party of United Pensioners of Serbia (PUPS).

Private life and media career
Jovanović lives in Belgrade. He has served at different times as editor-in-chief and creative director of telegraf.rs, a tabloid news portal. He has also appeared on the reality television programs Veliki brat (Big Brother; 2007) and Farma (The Farm; 2009). In 2013, he attracted unfavourable media coverage for hitting KK Partizan coach Duško Vujošević with a basketball during a game against KK Crvena zvezda.

Politician
The PUPS contested the 2020 Serbian parliamentary election in an alliance with the Serbian Progressive Party. Jovanović received the 117th position on the Progressive Party's Aleksandar Vučić — For Our Children coalition list and was elected when the list won a landslide majority with 188 mandates. He is now a member of the committee on human and minority rights and gender equality, a deputy member of the culture and information committee, the environmental protection committee, and the committee on the diaspora and Serbs in the region, and a member of Serbia's parliamentary friendship groups with China, Egypt, Israel, Italy, the Netherlands, Portugal, Slovenia, Turkey, the United Arab Emirates, and the United States of America.

References

External links
ALEKSANDAR JOVANOVIĆ

1968 births
Living people
Politicians from Belgrade
Members of the National Assembly (Serbia)
Party of United Pensioners of Serbia politicians